William Newell Vaile (June 22, 1876 – July 2, 1927) was a U.S. Representative from Colorado.

Born in Kokomo, Indiana, Vaile moved with his parents to Denver, Colorado, in 1881. Vaile was of English descent. He attended the public schools and graduated from Yale University in 1898. During the Spanish–American War, he served as a private in the First Regiment of the Connecticut Volunteer Field Artillery from May 19, 1898, to October 25, 1898.

Vaile studied law at the University of Colorado in 1899 and Harvard Law School in 1900–01. He was admitted to the bar in 1901 and began his practice in Denver. He was counsel for the Denver & Rio Grande Railroad, 1901–16, and he served as County Attorney for Jefferson County from 1911 to 1914. He married Kate Rothwell Varrell on June 14, 1914. Valie was a Republican candidate for Congress in 1916. He served on the Mexican border from June 28 to December 1, 1916, as a second lieutenant in the First Separate Battalion, National Guard of Colorado.

Vaile was elected as a Republican to the Sixty-sixth and to the four succeeding Congresses, serving from March 4, 1919, until his death on July 2, 1927. He served as chairman of the Committee on Expenditures in the Department of the Treasury (Sixty-eighth Congress, March 4, 1923 to March 3, 1925).

Congressman Vaile co-sponsored the Cummins-Vaile Bill which was introduced on April 8, 1924. It was the first birth control bill to reach debate in Congress of the United States.

Congressman Vaile was a noted restrictionist. He was a prominent supporter of the United States Immigration Act of 1924, also known as the National Origins Act, Johnson-Reed Act, or the Immigration Quota Act of 1924. This legislation  limited the number of immigrants who could be admitted from any country to 2% of the number of people from that country who were already living in the United States in 1890 according to the census of 1890. These quotas remained in place with minor alterations until the Immigration and Nationality Act of 1965. They had the intended effect of shifting immigration dramatically from Southern, Central, and Eastern Europe to Northern and Western Europe with the foreseeable ethnic results.

On the issue of immigration Vaile said:

In the Fall of 1925, Vaile published a novel, The Mystery of Golconda, which dealt with life in the mining camps of the Rocky Mountains.

During his life, Vaile was a member of the University Club (Denver), the Cactus Club, Masonic orders, the Spanish War Veterans, the Denver Civic and Commercial Association, and the Denver School League.

On July 2, 1927, Congressman Vaile died of a sudden heart attack as he was traveling by car with friends and family to Grand Lake near Rocky Mountain National Park for the Fourth of July. He was interred in Fairmount Cemetery in Denver, Colorado.

See also
List of United States Congress members who died in office (1900–49)

References

External links
 
 New York Times: "Soviet Ark Lands its Reds in Finland," January 18, 1920, accessed July 9, 2010
 New York Times: "BEFORE THE BUFORD SAILED - Eyewitness Tells of Ceremonial to Berkman and Anarchist Hoots for Incoming Immigrants' Cheers," January 11, 1920, Editorial by William N. Vaile, Representative from Colorado, Page 41, accessed July 9, 2010
 New York Times: "REPRESENTATIVE VAILE DISTRUSTS RED OFFERS - Tells of Talk With Martens and Urges Against Entering Into Trade Relations," November 26, 1920, To The Editors of the New York Times by William N. Vaile, House of Representatives, Page 15, accessed July 9, 2010

1876 births
1927 deaths
University of Colorado alumni
Harvard Law School alumni
American people of English descent
People from Kokomo, Indiana
Republican Party members of the United States House of Representatives from Colorado